Sudan's Narcotic Drugs and Psychotropic Substances Act, passed in 1994, is designed to fulfill that country's treaty obligations under the Single Convention on Narcotic Drugs, Convention on Psychotropic Substances, and United Nations Convention Against Illicit Traffic in Narcotic Drugs and Psychotropic Substances.

References
Narcotic Drugs and Psychotropic Substances Act, 1994 .

1994 in law
Drug control law
Law of Sudan
1994 in Sudan